Manab Adhikar Sangram Samiti (MASS) (Assamese মানৱ অধিকাৰ সংগ্ৰাম সমিতি) is a regional non-profit human rights NGO in Assam. It was founded in 1991 by Parag Kumar Das along with a group of intellectuals and journalists of Assam. The present chairman is Ajit Kumar Bhuyan and its headquarters is at Bamunimoidam, Guwahati.

The NGO has been working on protection and promotion of human rights both civil and political, human rights education and mass mobilization, resistance and documentation of human rights violations. It also challenges the alleged human rights violations in Assam by the Indian Army, paramilitary forces and state police.

See also
 Asom Sena
 List of human rights organisations

External links
MASS

References

Human rights organisations based in India
Organisations based in Assam
1991 establishments in Assam
Organizations established in 1991